The International Bartenders Association (IBA), founded on 24 February 1951 in the saloon of the Grand Hotel in Torquay, England, is an international organisation established in order to represent the best bartenders in the world.

An annual event, both World Cocktail Competition (WCC) and World Flairtending Competition (WFC) were presented and organised by the IBA. The IBA also sanctions a list of official cocktails.

Each year the events take place in different destinations. For instance in 2006, the competitions were held in Meliton Porto Carras Hotel, Halkidiki, Greece, from 6 October 2006 (for the 32nd annual WCC) to 7 October 2006 (for the 7th annual WFC).

See also
List of IBA official cocktails

References

External links

Organizations established in 1951
Bartending
Bartenders
1951 establishments in England